The 2017 UNOH 175 was the 17th stock car race of the 2017 NASCAR Camping World Truck Series, the first race of the 2017 NASCAR Camping World Truck Series playoffs, the first race of the Round of 8, and the 20th and final iteration of the event. The race was held on Saturday, September 23, 2017, in Loudon, New Hampshire at New Hampshire Motor Speedway, a  permanent oval-shaped racetrack. The race took the scheduled 175 laps to complete. At race's end, Christopher Bell, driving for Kyle Busch Motorsports, would win both stages, and lead 73 laps of the race to earn his 7th career NASCAR Camping World Truck Series win, and his fifth of the season. He would also earn a spot in the next round of the playoffs. To fill out the podium, Ryan Truex of Hattori Racing Enterprises and Todd Gilliland of Kyle Busch Motorsports would finish second and third, respectively.

Background 

The race was held at New Hampshire Motor Speedway, which is a  oval speedway located in Loudon, New Hampshire, which has hosted NASCAR racing annually since 1990, as well as the longest-running motorcycle race in North America, the Loudon Classic. Nicknamed "The Magic Mile", the speedway is often converted into a  road course, which includes much of the oval.

The track was originally the site of Bryar Motorsports Park before being purchased and redeveloped by Bob Bahre. The track is currently one of eight major NASCAR tracks owned and operated by Speedway Motorsports.

Entry list 

 (R) denotes rookie driver.
 (i) denotes driver who is ineligible for series driver points.

Practice

First practice 
The first practice session was held on Friday, September 22, at 1:30 PM EST. The session would last for 55 minutes.

Final practice 
The final practice session was held on Friday, September 22, at 3:30 PM EST. The session would last for 55 minutes.

Qualifying 
Qualifying was held on Saturday, September 23, at 10:05 AM EST. Since New Hampshire Motor Speedway is under , the qualifying system was a multi-car system that included three rounds. The first round was 15 minutes, where every driver would be able to set a lap within the 15 minutes. Then, the second round would consist of the fastest 24 cars in Round 1, and drivers would have 10 minutes to set a lap. Round 3 consisted of the fastest 12 drivers from Round 2, and the drivers would have 5 minutes to set a time. Whoever was fastest in Round 3 would win the pole.

Full qualifying results

Race results 
Stage 1 Laps: 55

Stage 2 Laps: 55

Stage 3 Laps: 65

Standings after the race 

Drivers' Championship standings

Note: Only the first 8 positions are included for the driver standings.

References 

2017 NASCAR Camping World Truck Series
NASCAR races at New Hampshire Motor Speedway
September 2017 sports events in the United States
2017 in sports in New Hampshire